Seán MacEllin (died 1 September 1969) was an Irish Fianna Fáil politician. He was a member of Seanad Éireann from 1928 to 1936, 1938 to 1943 and 1944 to 1948. He was first elected to the Free State Seanad in 1928 for 3 years. He was re-elected for a 9-year term at the 1931 Seanad election and served until the Free State Seanad was abolished in 1936. At the 1938 and 1943 elections, he was elected by the Industrial and Commercial Panel. He did not contest the 1948 Seanad election.

References

Year of birth missing
1969 deaths
Fianna Fáil senators
Irish farmers
Members of the 1928 Seanad
Members of the 1931 Seanad
Members of the 3rd Seanad
Members of the 5th Seanad
People from County Mayo